William Matthew Beal (17 March 1877 – 3 August 1964) was a New Zealand cricketer who played for Otago. He was born in Launceston, Tasmania, Australia in 1877.

Beal made a single first-class appearance for the side in the 1909–10 Plunket Shield against Auckland. He scored a single run in the match.

Beal later stood as umpire in five first-class matches, including the second international match in 1927–28 between the touring Australian team and New Zealand at Carisbrook in Dunedin. His brother, Carl, played first-class cricket for Otago and Canterbury.

Beal died at Dunedin in 1964 aged 87.

References

External links

1877 births
1964 deaths
Australian emigrants to New Zealand
Cricketers from Launceston, Tasmania
New Zealand cricket umpires
New Zealand cricketers
Otago cricketers